Charlie Gamble (born 25 April 1996 in New Zealand) is a rugby union player who plays for the NSW Waratahs in Super Rugby. His playing position is flanker. He originally signed to the Waratahs squad for the 2020 season.

Reference list

External links
Rugby.com.au profile
itsrugby.co.uk profile

1996 births
New Zealand rugby union players
Living people
Rugby union flankers
New South Wales Waratahs players
Sydney (NRC team) players
Rugby union players from Canterbury, New Zealand